Camano Island  is a large island in Possession Sound, a section of Puget Sound. It is part of Island County, Washington, and is located between Whidbey Island and the mainland (Snohomish County) by the Saratoga Passage to the west and Port Susan and Davis Slough to the east. The island has one road connection to the mainland, via State Route 532 over the Camano Gateway Bridge at the northeast end of the island, connecting to the city of Stanwood.

It has a year-round population of 15,661 as of the 2010 census. The population peaks at over 17,000 during the summer months due to part-time residents with vacation homes on the island. It is an unincorporated area with several small communities and shares civic facilities with nearby Stanwood, including its school district, and post office.

Camano Island is home to two state parks, Cama Beach and Camano Island State Park, and several county and local parks.

History

Etymology

Camano Island is named for 18th century Spanish explorer Jacinto Caamaño. The original name of the island was Kal-lut-chin which in the language of the indigenous Snohomish tribe means "land jutting into a bay". American explorer Charles Wilkes, during the Wilkes Expedition of 1838–1842, named it MacDonough Island in honor of Thomas MacDonough for his victory of the Battle of Lake Champlain during the War of 1812. Following this theme, Wilkes named the body of water between Camano and Whidbey Island after MacDonough's flagship the Saratoga. When Henry Kellett reorganized the official British Admiralty charts in 1847, he removed Wilkes' name MacDonough and bestowed the name Camano, which the Spanish explorer Francisco de Eliza had originally given to Admiralty Inlet in 1790. Wilkes' name Saratoga Passage was retained.

Jacinto Caamaño explored much of the Pacific Northwest going as far north as what is now Alaska for the Spanish. He began his expedition far to the south in San Blas, Mexico. In addition to its Snohomish name the island has also been known as Macdonough Island named for Thomas Macdonough a U.S. Navy officer during the War of 1812 and as Perry Island after an 1855 treaty between local Native Americans and Washington Territory governor Isaac Stevens. The first Euro-American settlers on the island arrived at the time of the signing of the treaty. The island was also called Crow Island during the early 20th century. The Tulalip Tribe has compiled many geographic place names for the Salish Sea, including Camano Island.

19th century

The island was shared between several local Coast Salish groups, who settled along beaches and gathered shellfish, hunted game, and cultivated berries. Among the groups were the Kikiallus, Lower Skagit, Sauk-Suiattle, Snohomish, and Stillaguamish. In 2005, archaeologists at Cama Beach on the southwest coast of the island uncovered Salish artifacts and human remains that were dated to 1,600 years before present; the site is believed to have been a seasonal or permanent village and burial ground. A major landslide on the south side of Camano Island in the 1820s reduced the size of the island and caused a tsunami on Saratoga Passage.

By the early 19th century, during the beginning of relations between Coast Salish tribes and white explorers, the island was divided between the Kikiallus in the north, with six permanent villages, and seasonal villages for the Snohomish in the south. White settlement on the island began in the 1850s and it was included in the newly-established Island County in 1853. The first major settlement on the island was at Utsalady (originally spelled Utsaladdy), which would be home to several sawmills. The first sawmill on the island was constructed by Thomas Cranney in 1858 and a school district was organized in 1862 to serve 17 students in a one-room schoolhouse.

Cranney's sawmill at Utsalady was seized by the federal government in 1876 due to his bankruptcy and sold the following year to the Puget Mill Company, which enlarged it to handle 75,000 board feet per day. A plat for Utsalady was filed in 1891, with the town boasting three stores, two hotels, a telegraph line, and daily steamship service to Coupeville. The area had a large population of Chinese and Norwegian immigrants who worked at the mill until the former were expelled by anti-Chinese riots in the 1880s. By the 1880 census, there were 112 residents in Utsalady and 74 Coast Salish peoples in other settlements on Camano Islande. Following the Panic of 1893, the Utsalady sawmill was closed and left 125 residents unemployed, but five shingle mills were later opened to capitalize on the island's timber.

20th century

Camano Island was identified as an ideal location for farming and vacation homes during the early 20th century, as logging had cleared the island's old-growth forests. A cable ferry connecting the island's north end to Stanwood was replaced by a bridge in 1909. The first resort settlements on Camano Island at Utsalady, Juniper Beach, and Madrona beach were established in the 1920s, but were later dwarfed by larger resorts like Cama Beach (opened in 1936). During the Prohibition era, Camano Island was used as a major transiting point for rumrunners due to its remoteness and proximity to Canadian waters. The Juniper Beach area was also home to a new oyster farm that was established in 1930 and helped sustain the island during the Great Depression.

In 1943, the Puget Mill Company began developing its plots into residential subdivisions, ushering in the arrival of permanent summer homes on the island. The Stillaguamish River bridge to Stanwood was replaced in July 1950 by the Mark Clark Bridge and the island's roads were also improved by the state government. A new state park was established in 1948 and opened the following year after a day-long event in which 800 residents cleared the land to prepare for park development. In the 1950s, the island received its own post office, having previously been part of the Stanwood post office's delivery area, an organized fire department, and telephone service. Major population growth in the 1960s and early 1970s caused strain on the island's infrastructure, requiring the creation of a new planning office and a satellite county courthouse.

Geography

Camano Island is located within the Puget Sound, separated from the mainland of Snohomish County by Port Susan and Davis Slough. It lies east of the Saratoga Passage, which separates it from the larger Whidbey Island, and is south of Skagit Bay.

According to the United States Census Bureau, the Camano CDP has a total area of 94.9 square miles (245.9 km2), of which, 39.8 square miles (103.0 km2) of it is land and 55.2 square miles (142.9 km2) of it (58.11%) is water. Approximately 83 percent of the shoreline around the island is privately owned.

The island has a wide array of native and migratory birds, including bald eagles and herons. Migrating gray whales travel annually through the Saratoga Passage in March and April, making them visible from Camano Island.

During the Last Ice Age the island, sound and land surrounding the sound was covered by a mile thick sheet of ice. As temperatures rose the glacier receded, carving the island and leaving behind deposits of glacial till.

Communities

Utsalady
Terry's Corner (including new town center)
Buena Vista
Madrona Beach
Sunset Beach
Juniper Beach
Lona Beach
Rockaway Beach
Maple Grove Beach
Livingston Bay
Iverson Beach
Tillicum Beach
Tyee Beach 
Camaloch

Parks and recreation

The state parks system has two properties on Camano Island: Camano Island State Park and Cama Beach State Park, both located on the west side of the island. Camano Island State Park, near Elger Bay, was opened in 1949 after a one-day volunteer effort with 500 local residents to prepare the property. Cama Beach State Park opened in 2008 at the site of a former beach resort, which was restored with beachside cabins and hiking trails.

Camano Island also has 13 local parks maintained by the Island County government. The largest park, Camano Ridge, includes  of inland protected forestland and hiking trails that were transferred from the Washington State Department of Natural Resources in 2003. At the north end of the island is Iverson Preserve, a  beach and estuary with fishing and boat access.

Demographics

Camano Island has a large seasonal population of snowbirds and other part-time residents, which brings the summer population of the island to an estimated 17,000. The retiree population on the island began arriving in the mid-20th century, including residents from outside of Washington state. Based on per capita income, one of the more reliable measures of affluence, Camano ranks 99th of 522 areas in the state of Washington to be ranked.

2000 census

As of the 2000 census, there were 13,347 people, 5,357 households, and 4,028 families residing in the Camano Island CDP. The population density was 335.6 people per square mile (129.6/km2). There were 6,709 housing units at an average density of 168.7/sq mi (65.1/km2). The racial makeup of the CDP was 95.6% White, 0.3% African American, 0.8% Native American, 0.7% Asian, 0.3% Pacific Islander, 0.6% from other races, and 1.8% from two or more races. Hispanic or Latino of any race were 2.1% of the population.

There were 5,357 households, out of which 28.8% had children under the age of 18 living with them, 66.0% were married couples living together, 6.3% had a female householder with no husband present, and 24.8% were non-families. 20.2% of all households were made up of individuals, and 8.5% had someone living alone who was 65 years of age or older. The average household size was 2.49 and the average family size was 2.86.

In the CDP, the population was spread out, with 24.1% under the age of 18, 4.8% from 18 to 24, 25.2% from 25 to 44, 27.7% from 45 to 64, and 18.3% who were 65 years of age or older. The median age was 43 years. For every 100 females, there were 99.5 males. For every 100 females age 18 and over, there were 96.9 males.

The median income for a household in the CDP was $54,262, and the median income for a family was $60,013. Males had a median income of $47,309 versus $31,250 for females. The per capita income for the CDP was $24,362. About 4.4% of families and 5.6% of the population were below the poverty line, including 6.5% of those under age 18 and 3.3% of those age 65 or over.

Government

Camano Island is part of Island County, despite its only road connection leading to Snohomish County, and has no incorporated communities. The island's residents have previously proposed incorporating as a city or joining Snohomish County to increase access to services, but to no result. Island County maintains a small government campus on Camano Island that opened in the 1970s to house the county sheriff and other offices. The original campus was replaced by the Island County Administration Building, which opened in late 2020.

The island shares several of its services with neighboring Stanwood, including the Stanwood-Camano School District. The school district has two elementary schools on Camano Island, opened in the 2000s, while older students attend classes at Stanwood's schools. Sno-Isle Libraries, which serves Island and Snohomish counties, opened a public library inside a temporary space on Camano Island as part of a pilot program that began in 2007. A permanent library at Terry's Corner opened in August 2015 after voters on the island approved a $2.3 million bond measure to remodel a former restaurant.

Culture

Events
 The Port Susan Snow Goose & Birding Festival (February)
 The Camano Island Mother's Day Art Studio Tour (May)
 The Spring Art Show (June)
 Art by the Bay, The Stanwood–Camano Festival of Art and Music (July)
 The Stanwood Camano Community Fair (August) 
 The Harvest Jubilee (September)

Notable people

 Mark W. Clark, U.S. Army general
 William Corson, actor
 Jack Gunter, artist
 Colton Harris-Moore, former fugitive known as the "Barefoot Bandit"
 Mary Margaret Haugen, state senator
 Dave Hayes, state legislator
 Caitlin Kinnunen, actress
 Thomas T. Minor, former mayor of Seattle and Port Townsend
 Robert Neale, ace pilot
 Pearl Anderson Wanamaker, state legislator and state superintendent of schools
 Laurie Z, musician
 Alfred Zeisler, film producer, director, actor and screenwriter

Transportation

Camano Island is connected to mainland Washington by State Route 532, which travels from the north end of the island to Stanwood via two bridges over the Davis Slough and Stillaguamish River. The island has several connecting roads that travel along the west and east edges to various neighborhoods and the two state parks. Island Transit operates free bus services connecting Camano Island to Stanwood, with onward connections to Mount Vernon, Amtrak Cascades, and Everett.

Ferry connections to Coupeville and Everett existed historically, but the routes are no longer active. Local residents rejected a car ferry in 1999. A passenger-only Camano–Whidbey ferry has been proposed and studied by Island County.

See also
 List of islands of Washington (state)

References

External links

Camano Island Chamber of Commerce

Census-designated places in Island County, Washington
Census-designated places in Washington (state)
Landforms of Island County, Washington
Islands of Washington (state)
Islands of Puget Sound